The Hamilton Mountain A's are a defunct Junior "A" ice hockey team from Hamilton, Ontario, Canada.  They were a part of the Ontario Provincial Junior A Hockey League.

History
Originating as the Hamilton Red Wing B's, the team became the Hamilton Mountain Bees in 1967 as a member of the Niagara & District Junior B Hockey League.  In 1974, the team switched over to the new Golden Horseshoe Junior B Hockey League.

The team joined the Southern Ontario Junior A Hockey League in 1975, and later joined the OPJHL in 1977. They folded in 1984 to make way for the Ontario Hockey League's Hamilton Steelhawks.

Season-by-season results

Playoffs
SOJHL Years
1976 Lost Semi-final
Chatham Maroons defeated Hamilton Mountain A's 4-games-to-3
1977 Lost Semi-final
Collingwood Blues defeated Hamilton Mountain A's 4-games-to-2
OPJHL Years
1978 DNQ
1979 DNQ
1980 DNQ
1981 Lost Quarter-final
North Bay Trappers defeated Hamilton Mountain A's 4-games-to-3
1982 DNQ
1983 Lost Semi-final
Hamilton Mountain A's defeated Dixie Beehives 4-games-to-1
North York Rangers defeated Hamilton Mountain A's 4-games-to-3
1984 Lost Quarter-final
Newmarket Flyers defeated Hamilton Mountain A's 4-games-to-none

Sutherland Cup appearances
1970: Dixie Beehives defeated Hamilton Mountain A's 4-games-to-1 with 1 tie
1971: Dixie Beehives defeated Hamilton Mountain A's 4-games-to-1

References

External links
OHA Website

Defunct ice hockey teams in Canada
Ice hockey teams in Ontario
Ice hockey teams in Hamilton, Ontario
1984 disestablishments in Ontario
Sports clubs disestablished in 1984
1960 establishments in Ontario
Ice hockey clubs established in 1960